The Hughes Covered Bridge is a historic covered bridge in Amwell Township, Washington County, Pennsylvania. Currently, it is used only for foot traffic. The queen post truss bridge is 12'4" wide and 55'6" long.

References

External links
[ National Register nomination form]

Covered bridges on the National Register of Historic Places in Pennsylvania
Covered bridges in Washington County, Pennsylvania
Bridges completed in 1889
Pedestrian bridges in Pennsylvania
Former road bridges in the United States
National Register of Historic Places in Washington County, Pennsylvania
Road bridges on the National Register of Historic Places in Pennsylvania
Wooden bridges in Pennsylvania